Mau–Anand Vihar Terminal Express, is an  Indian Railways  train of North Eastern Railway Zone Varanasi Division. It was introduced in 2013's Railway Budget and hence initiated its journey from November 2013. Mau Express consists of 23 coaches which includes one AC-II coach, four AC-III coaches, seven sleeper class coaches, nine general (unreserved) coaches and two SLR coaches.

Reservation
People have to take an advanced reservation ticket to travel in the train except for the General class. Tatkal Ticket facility also available in this train.

Coach composition

Rake maintenance 

The train is maintained by the Anand Vihar Coaching Depot. The same rake is used for Gorakhpur–Anand Vihar Express for one way which is altered by the second rake on the other way.

Journey

Traction
Both trains are hauled by a Mau junction washing pit based WDP-4B/WDP4D diesel locomotive.

Notes

References

External links 
15025/Mau - Anand Vihar Terminal Express
 15026/Anand Vihar Terminal - Mau Express

Rail transport in Uttar Pradesh
Rail transport in Delhi
Express trains in India
Transport in Delhi
Railway services introduced in 2013
Mau